Pepsi Next (stylized as pepsi next or pepsi NEXT) is a discontinued cola-flavored carbonated soft drink produced by PepsiCo. It was a variant of the Pepsi cola range.

In some markets it was sweetened with high fructose corn syrup, sugar, acesulfame potassium, and sucralose, and marketed toward drinkers of full-calorie Pepsi, and those who do not enjoy the taste of Diet Pepsi, Pepsi ONE, Pepsi Max, and other diet colas.

On June 25, 2013, PepsiCo informed their Facebook readers that the new formulation of Pepsi Next no longer contained aspartame, the artificial sweetener used in many diet soft drinks including Diet Pepsi, hence some bottles sold in the U.S. read 'aspartame free'. However, the continued presence of acesulfame potassium means this version of the product still contained artificial sweeteners.

In other marketing areas, including Canada, Finland, the Netherlands, Australia and New Zealand, where it was marketed as having "30% less sugar", Pepsi Next was sweetened using an extract from stevia and had no artificial sweeteners.

Creation
Pepsi Edge, Pepsi's first mid-calorie cola, was introduced in 2004, and discontinued only two years later. PepsiCo, towards the end of the 2000s found new interest in mid-calorie beverages, and then released G2, a version of Gatorade with less than half the calories, and in the year 2011, Trop50, a juice blend, with 50% the calories of regular juice.

In September 2007, PepsiCo filed for trademarks in the US Patent and Trademark Office, for "Pepsi Next", and "Diet Pepsi Next".

In 2010, PepsiCo began to test Pepsi Next via market research groups. In June 2011, PepsiCo announced that Pepsi Next was going to be moved into two test markets, Cedar Rapids, Iowa, and Eau Claire, Wisconsin. After testing, on February 27, 2012, PepsiCo announced the launch of Pepsi Next.

In the Australian market, Pepsi Next was bottled by Schweppes Australia and is sweetened by stevia which reduces the sugar content by 30% compared to regular Pepsi. Pepsi Next was first introduced in France in March 2013, and in Finland and Canada in March 2014. Stevia extract is used in all three markets.

Reception and taste
One site stated that, Although it contains three artificial sweeteners and has 60 percent fewer calories than regular Pepsi, it's really hard to taste anything "diet" about Pepsi Next. But it's not quite like regular Pepsi; it's less syrupy and smoother. There are also differences in flavor between Pepsi Next and original Pepsi. I thought Pepsi Next had a slightly stronger cola flavor and, for some reason, my taste buds perceived a hint of lemon.

According to the BevReview, the initial taste of Pepsi Next is similar to original Pepsi, but this is followed by the less pleasant taste of artificial sweeteners.

Marketing
After the launch of Pepsi Next, a television commercial was launched that depicted a young couple, enjoying Pepsi Next.

Eva Longoria, Paula Patton, and Nicki Minaj all have featured in advertisements for Pepsi Next. Paula Patton has filmed a television commercial for Pepsi Next, as has Nicki Minaj.

A series of Internet and print ads were made, with a picture of a can of Pepsi Next, with the words: Real Cola Taste, 60% Less Sugar, Drink It To Believe It.

In the 2013 Super Bowl, Pepsi used its advertising minutes right before the halftime show (which featured Beyonce, a "brand ambassador" for Pepsi) to advertise Pepsi Next. The presentation by Pepsi (the halftime show plus the advertising) was unique in that it featured photos of Pepsi customers. Pepsi had asked customers to send in photos before the Super Bowl.

See also
 Pepsi Edge The mid-calorie cola that preceded Pepsi Next, was considered a failure, and was discontinued after two years
 Diet Pepsi The original diet cola version of Pepsi
 Pepsi Max A highly caffeinated diet cola.
 Pepsi ONE A different diet cola, with one calorie and sweetened with Splenda

References

External links
 Pepsi Next on Facebook
 BevReview Review of Pepsi Next
 Pepsi Official Website
 Official Press Release About Pepsi Next's Nationwide Release

PepsiCo cola brands
Products introduced in 2012
Products and services discontinued in 2015
Discontinued soft drinks